Pierre Terjanian (born in Strasbourg, France) is the Arthur Ochs Sulzberger Curator in Charge of The Met Department of Arms and Armor at the Metropolitan Museum of Art in New York City. Terjanian has a graduate degree in History from the Université de Metz. Prior to his  tenure at the Metropolitan Museum of Art which he joined in 2012 he held the dual role of J. J. Medveckis Associate Curator of Arms and Armor and acting head of the Department of European Decorative Arts and Sculpture before 1700 at the Philadelphia Museum of Art.

Terjanian is the author of The Last Knight: The Art, Armor, and Ambition of Maximilian I which accompanied and augmented the exhibition he curated at the Metropolitan Museum of Art and Princely Armor in the Age of Dürer: A Renaissance Masterpiece in the Philadelphia Museum of Art".

In 2018 and 2019 Terjanian arranged a series of live events where hip hop dancers from New York City dance collective It's Showtime NYC founded andvsoinsored by the South Bronx located non-profit "Dancing in the Streets" performed  in replica armor in the Emma and Georgina Bloomberg Arms and Armor Court at the Metropolitan Museum of Art.

References

Living people
American curators
Metropolitan Museum of Art
Year of birth missing (living people)
Historians of weapons